Hulme is a hamlet on the outskirts of the city of Stoke-on-Trent, in the English county of Staffordshire. Unlike Hulme End and Upper Hulme, Hulme village is situated on the city council owned boundary of Park Hall Country Park.

Hamlets in Staffordshire